Marten Strauch (born 25 September 1986 in Heidelberg) is a German international rugby union player, playing for the SC Neuenheim in the Rugby-Bundesliga and the German national rugby union team.

Strauch made his debut for Germany on 21 April 2007 against Ukraine.

He is playing rugby since 1991.

Strauch has also played for the Germany's 7's side in the past, like at the World Games 2005 in Duisburg, where Germany finished 8th.

Honours

National team
 European Nations Cup - Division 2
 Champions: 2008

Stats
Marten Strauch's personal statistics in club and international rugby:

Club

 As of 30 April 2012

National team

European Nations Cup

Friendlies & other competitions

 As of 28 April 2013

References

External links
 Marten Strauch at scrum.com
   Marten Strauch at totalrugby.de

1986 births
Living people
German rugby union players
Germany international rugby union players
RG Heidelberg players
SC Neuenheim players
Rugby union centres
Sportspeople from Heidelberg